Hobson's Choice, is an historic home located at Woodbine, Howard County, Maryland. It is a five-bay, two-and-a-half-story rectangular brick house built about 1830, with a low-pitched gable roof and a recent low two-story frame rear wing. The woodwork is Greek Revival in influence.

It was listed on the National Register of Historic Places in 1984.

See also
List of Howard County properties in the Maryland Historical Trust

References

External links
, including photo from 2004, at Maryland Historical Trust

Houses on the National Register of Historic Places in Maryland
Federal architecture in Maryland
Houses completed in 1830
Howard County, Maryland landmarks
Houses in Howard County, Maryland
1830 establishments in Maryland
National Register of Historic Places in Howard County, Maryland